"Rich Sex" is a 2018 song by Nicki Minaj.

It may also refer to:

 "Rich Sex", a song by Future from the album DS2, 2015